Zilli is a surname. Notable people with the surname include:

 Aldo Zilli (born 1956), Italian-British celebrity chef
 Carlos Pedro Zilli (1954–2021), Brazilian–Guinea-Bissauan bishop
 Emma Zilli (1864–1901), Italian soprano singer
 Ishtiyaq Ahmad Zilli (born 1942), Indian scholar
 Mehmed Zilli, the real name of Ottoman traveler Evliya Çelebi (1611 – c. 1682)
 Nina Zilli (born 1980), Italian singer-songwriter

See also 

 Zilli (disambiguation)